Bleddyn Ddu (c. 1200) was a Welsh poet.  Some of his works were included in the ‘Red Book of Hergest’ - to God, and to the abbot of Aberconway.

References 

13th-century Welsh poets